Vega de Espinareda (A Veiga de Espiñareda in Galician language) is a village and municipality located in the region of El Bierzo (province of León, Castile and León, Spain) . According to the 2004 census (INE), the municipality has a population of 2,705 inhabitants.

It is one of Galician speaking councils of Castilla y León

References

External links 
 Vega de Espinareda / A Veiga de Espiñareda
 Pinturas Rupestres Esquematicas de Sésamo
 O Castro de Piñeira<
 Fotografías de Vega de Espinareda
 Mapa de Situacion con Google Maps

Municipalities in El Bierzo